The following roads are named Central Expressway:
Central Expressway, Singapore
Central Expressway (California), part of County Route G6 in Santa Clara County, California
Central Expressway (Dallas), part of U.S. Highway 75 in Dallas, Texas
Central Expressway (England), part of the A533 road in Runcorn, Cheshire
Central Expressway (Korea), translation of Jungang Expressway (Expressway No.55)